Mong Kung  Township or Mongkaung Township is a township of Loilen District in the Shan State of Burma. The principal town is Mong Kung.

Sometime prior to 2002, the southern portion of Mong Kung Township was transferred to Hopong Township in Taunggyi District.

There are five urban quarters, 348 villages in 24 village tracts with a total population of 61,633 in 2015. 40,571 acres were cultivated for agriculture.

Towns and Villages

 Ang-nu
 Hai Hkai
 Hai-hso
 Hai-kun
 Hai Kwe
 Hamngai
 Hkai-makking
 Hkai-wun
 Hkam-hawng
 Hkamna
 Hki-hkaw
 Hko Hpai Mai
 Hkok Lin
 Hko-lu
 Hko-mit
 Hko Mong
 Hko-ut
 Hko-yep
 Hkumhpok
 Ho Heng
 Ho-hkai (21°59'0"N 97°34'0"E)
 Ho-hkai (21°55'0"N 97°42'0"E)
 Ho-hkai (21°39'0"N 97°47'0"E)
 Ho-hko
 Ho-hpai
 Ho-hpoi
 Ho-löng (21°44'0"N 97°52'0"E)
 Ho Long (21°16'0"N 97°10'0"E)
 Ho-mang
 Ho-nā
 Ho-nā
 Ho-nam
 Ho-nawng
 Hona Yok
 Ho-to
 Hpa-hki
 Hpai-man
 Hpakchem
 Hpa Kēng
 Hpak Hkyem
 Hpakpong
 Hpa-lai
 Hpa-lan
 Hpā-mai
 Hpan Kawk
 Hpa Süi
 Hpa-wan
 Hpawnghsing
 Hpöngmung
 Hputan
 Hpya-ling
 Hsam-pun
 Hsang-hsong
 Hsangka
 Hsang Tai
 Hsa-taw
 Hsawngke
 Hsawng Pun
 Hsaw Taw
 Hsiphseng
 Hsi Song
 Htamlaya
 Htānghkan
 Hti-hpo
 Hti-re
 Htonbong
 Hwè-ham
 Hwe-he
 Hwè-hok
 Hwe-hwe
 Hwè Kot
 Hwe-lok
 Hwè-long
 Hwè-mawng
 Hwè-nio
 Hwè-noi (21°46'0"N 97°33'0"E)
 Hwè-noi (21°45'0"N 97°33'0"E)
 Hwepawn
 Hwè-taw
 Hwè-wa (21°57'0"N 97°47'0"E)
 Hwè-wa (21°43'0"N 97°51'0"E)
 Ka Lu
 Kawnghāk
 Kawnghsai
 Kawnglang
 Kawnglèng
 Kawngmu-tau
 Kawngpwa
 Kēnghkam
 Keng Hkam
 Konghai-ping
 Konghsa (21°55'0"N 97°35'0"E)
 Kong-hsa
 Konghsa (21°41'0"N 97°44'0"E)
 Konghsim
 Kongkaw (21°53'0"N 97°46'0"E)
 Kongkaw (21°44'0"N 97°48'0"E)
 Kongkēng
 Kong King
 Kongkyan
 Kong La
 Konglang (21°53'0"N 97°47'0"E)
 Konglang (21°52'0"N 97°34'0"E)
 Konglang (21°51'0"N 97°34'0"E)
 Kong-loi-htam
 Kong Long
 Kong Lüng
 Kong-mak-heng
 Kongmakmöng
 Kongmawng
 Kongme-an
 Kong-mong (21°46'0"N 97°41'0"E)
 Kongmong (21°43'0"N 97°45'0"E)
 Kong Mong (21°37'0"N 97°29'0"E)
 Kongmöng (21°34'0"N 97°31'0"E)
 Kong Möng (21°11'0"N 97°21'0"E)
 Kongmu
 Kongnim
 Kong Nok
 Köngnyawng (22°2'0"N 97°20'0"E)
 Kongnyawng (21°38'0"N 97°34'0"E)
 Kong Nyawng
 Kongpaw
 Kongsaihsu
 Köng-sam
 Kongtawng
 Kong Ten
 Konlang
 Konmo
 Kon Pao
 Konsa-lai
 Kung Nyawng
 Kungpau
 Kun-hsan
 Kunna (21°58'0"N 97°29'0"E)
 Kunna (21°43'0"N 97°35'0"E)
 Kunna (21°32'0"N 97°31'0"E)
 Kunniu
 Kuntawng
 Kun-weng
 Kuttēng
 Kyauktan
 Kyawk Ngak
 Kyawng-pong
 Kye-daw
 Kyi Taw
 Lai-hsak
 Lakting
 Leng Aka
 Len Mun
 Lenteng
 Li-maw
 Linhsong
 Linlum
 Loi-ham
 Loi-hke
 Loi-hku
 Loi-hkun
 Loi-hsa
 Loi-hsai
 Loi-hsam
 Loi-hsang
 Loi-hun
 Loi-kau
 Loi-lam
 Loi-leng (21°47'0"N 97°30'0"E)
 Loi-leng (21°38'0"N 97°32'0"E)
 Loi-lin
 Loi-mawkhkam
 Loi-ngon (21°50'0"N 97°36'0"E)
 Loi-ngon (21°29'0"N 97°38'0"E)
 Loi-pang
 Loi-paw
 Loi-pütau
 Loi-pwe
 Loi-sīn
 Loi-tawng
 Loi-wēng
 Loi-yai
 Loi-yoimanmaö
 Longhen (21°42'0"N 97°49'0"E)
 Longhēn (21°39'0"N 97°32'0"E)
 Long Hsam
 Long Hsiae
 Longka
 Long-mik
 Longmöng
 Longping
 Longwing
 Lukhpakha
 Lun-pun
 Mākhkinu
 Mak-hpīt
 Makhsan
 Mak-kun-wo
 Maklang
 Mak-mai
 Makman
 Mak Mi
 Mak Mo
 Makmöngkong
 Mak Mong Non
 Mak Pak
 Man Chengnoi
 Mān Hin
 Mān Hkēm
 Mān Hkong
 Mān Hpat
 Mān Hpwi
 Mān Htam
 Mān Htawk
 Mankat
 Man-kup
 Mān Kyawng (21°52'0"N 97°44'0"E)
 Mān Kyawng (21°47'0"N 97°47'0"E)
 Mān Law
 Mān Lawk
 Mān Leng
 Mān Maü
 Mān Nong
 Mān-pang
 Mān Penwen
 Mān Pong
 Mān Sam
 Mān-sawk
 Mawhseng
 Mi-lön
 Möng Hso
 Möng Küng
 Möng Lang (21°39'0"N 97°29'0"E)
 Möng Lang (21°23'0"N 97°21'0"E)
 Möng-lèng
 Mong Lwe
 Möng Yun
 Myawng U
 Nā-hi
 Nā-hkam
 Nā-hkan
 Na-hkau-long
 Nah Ma Na
 Na-hpawk
 Nā Hsam
 Nā Kawk
 Na-keng
 Na King
 Na Leng
 Nā-lip
 Nā-lo
 Nā Mau
 Nam Awn
 Nam-chēm
 Namhen
 Namhkam
 Namhkok
 Nam-hku
 Nam Hpuk
 Namhu (21°42'0"N 97°39'0"E)
 Namhu (21°32'0"N 97°41'0"E)
 Namhu (21°29'0"N 97°35'0"E)
 Namhu (20°54'0"N 97°18'0"E)
 Namkat
 Nam Kin
 Nam-kom
 Namkong
 Nam Mak Lawt
 Nammawhsamhkan
 Nam Maw Hsing
 Nam Maw Hsum
 Nammawleng
 Nam Maw Lik
 Nammawsing
 Namngo
 Namnip
 Nampa-chi
 Nam Pā-ki
 Nam Pa Lan
 Nampangmöng
 Nampa-sat
 Nam Pon
 Nampong (21°46'0"N 97°39'0"E)
 Nampong (21°40'0"N 97°33'0"E)
 Namsang
 Namsa-pai
 Namtau
 Namtawng
 Nam-un (21°54'0"N 97°46'0"E)
 Nam-un (21°48'0"N 97°46'0"E)
 Nā Mun
 Nam-yang
 Nam-ya-yum
 Na-new
 Na-nging
 Na Nio
 Na-noi
 Nan Wen
 Nā-pong
 Na-pong (21°48'0"N 97°13'0"E)
 Nā-pong (21°44'0"N 97°51'0"E)
 Nā-pong (21°15'0"N 97°6'0"E)
 Nā Tat
 Nā Tawng
 Natawng Hsit
 Nā-ti
 Na-tit
 Nā-un
 Nā Wen
 Nawnghai
 Nawnghkam
 Nawng-hkam
 Nawnghkio (22°2'0"N 97°29'0"E)
 Nawnghkio (21°27'0"N 97°29'0"E)
 Nawng Hko Hkam
 Nawnghpa
 Nawng Hpeik
 Nawng Hsong
 Nawng Hwi (21°28'0"N 97°27'0"E)
 Nawng Hwi (21°27'0"N 97°27'0"E)
 Nawngkai
 Nawngla-yaw
 Nawng Leng (21°57'0"N 97°32'0"E)
 Nawng Leng (21°5'0"N 97°11'0"E)
 Nawng Lio
 Nawngmun (21°49'0"N 97°39'0"E)
 Nawngmun (21°36'0"N 97°29'0"E)
 Nawng-naūn
 Nawng Pa Kin
 Nawngpa-lam
 Nawngsamhpo
 Nawngtaw
 Nawngwek
 Nawngwo
 Nawngya Hsai
 Nawng-yun
 Naw-nya
 Nā-yok
 Neng-hkio
 Ngammöng
 Nwè-hsem
 Nyawng Kwai
 Nyawng Tawk
 Nyawngwing
 Ong Pao
 Ongsang
 Pā-hpai
 Paknam
 Pa-la
 Pa-mawng
 Pa-möng
 Pangbo
 Pang Hkan
 Panghpit
 Panghsa
 Pānghsak
 Pang Hsan
 Pang Hsang
 Pāng-kat
 Pāngkaw
 Pang Kawn
 Pangke-tu
 Pangko
 Pangkot
 Pangkunlong
 Pāngkyehtu
 Panglaw
 Pang-lawn
 Pangling
 Panglong (21°45'0"N 97°39'0"E)
 Pānglong (21°15'0"N 97°12'0"E)
 Pangmaileng
 Pangme-leng
 Pangmong
 Pāngngu
 Pangnim
 Pangniu (21°56'0"N 97°30'0"E)
 Pangniu (21°45'0"N 97°42'0"E)
 Pāngpaw
 Pangsamhkam
 Pāngti
 Pang Tit-tiau
 Pang Yam
 Pa-pan
 Patayap
 Pawhpoi
 Ponghin
 Pongya Hsai
 Pongyam
 Pun-wun
 Sang-īp
 Sanglaw
 Sanglik
 Ta-da-ho-na
 Tai-na
 Taklèt
 Tā-long
 Tan Hping
 Tāpè
 Taung Paw
 Taüwoleng
 Tawmok
 Taw Mun
 Tawng
 Tawnglum
 Tawng-san
 Tawn Hsan
 Taw-sengka
 Tēngkyap
 Teng Leng
 Tenkal
 Teü-hai
 Tib-yu
 Ti-lon
 To-leng
 Tonglau
 Tonglong
 Tung-awn
 Tüngmun
 Tunmöng
 Wan He
 Wan Hkai (21°42'0"N 97°35'0"E)
 Wān Hkai (21°26'0"N 97°28'0"E)
 Wān Hkai-yam
 Wān Hkam
 Wān Hko-hin
 Wān-hkun
 Wān Ho-kwe (21°36'0"N 97°21'0"E)
 Wān Ho-kwe (21°36'0"N 97°19'0"E)
 Wan Ho-nā-mak-ik
 Wān Hpa-hkau
 Wān Hpakki
 Wān Hpakkom
 Wān Hpa-lang
 Wān Hpa-leng
 Wān Hpa-tang
 Wān Hpawnghseng
 Wan Hsai-leng (21°31'0"N 97°18'0"E)
 Wān Hsai Leng (21°12'0"N 97°7'0"E)
 Wān Hsa-lawng
 Wān Hsanha
 Wān Hsawngkut
 Wān Hsi-kap
 Wān Htam (21°55'0"N 97°14'0"E)
 Wān Htam (21°38'0"N 97°19'0"E)
 Wān Hwe (21°38'0"N 97°47'0"E)
 Wān Hwè (21°36'0"N 97°33'0"E)
 Wān Hwè-hsim
 Wān Hwè-loi
 Wān Hwè Lwat
 Wān Hwè-tang
 Wān Ka-hawk
 Wan Ka-hpeuk
 Wān Kan
 Wān Kan Awt
 Wān Kāp
 Wān Kat (21°56'0"N 97°22'0"E)
 Wan Kat (21°27'0"N 97°21'0"E)
 Wan-kawk
 Wān Kawng
 Wān-kawng-mu
 Wān Ke-man
 Wān Kenghkam (21°52'0"N 97°22'0"E)
 Wān Kenghkam (21°34'0"N 97°17'0"E)
 Wan Kengkam
 Wān Kengkawm
 Wān Kengtawng
 Wān Kong (21°37'0"N 97°18'0"E)
 Wān Kong (21°9'0"N 97°18'0"E)
 Wan Konghsa
 Wān Kongkaw
 Wān Kongkeng
 Wan Konglang
 Wān Köngnö-hpoi
 Wān Kongpau
 Wān Kun
 Wan Kwan Kaw
 Wān Kyawng (21°56'0"N 97°47'0"E)
 Wān Kyawng
 Wān Kyawng (21°7'0"N 97°9'0"E)
 Wān Kyong
 Wān Lakawn
 Wān Laklong
 Wan Loi (21°39'0"N 97°43'0"E)
 Wān Loi (21°34'0"N 97°35'0"E)
 Wan Loi (21°4'0"N 97°9'0"E)
 Wān Loi (21°3'0"N 97°19'0"E)
 Wān Loi Hkam
 Wān Loi-hkung
 Wan Loi-kong
 Wān Loi-mong
 Wān Loi-namtau
 Wān Loi-weng
 Wān Lokpa (21°40'0"N 97°14'0"E)
 Wān Lokpa (21°39'0"N 97°14'0"E)
 Wān Long (21°52'0"N 97°40'0"E)
 Wān-long (21°38'0"N 97°36'0"E)
 Wān Long-aungsaw
 Wān Long Hsa La
 Wān Longlan
 Wan Longyon
 Wān Lukkang
 Wān Lwè
 Wān Mai (21°41'0"N 97°47'0"E)
 Wān Mai (21°10'0"N 97°11'0"E)
 Wān Mak
 Wān Mak
 Wān Makhok
 Wān Makhsan
 Wan Mak Ka
 Wān Mak Lang
 Wān Mak Leng
 Wān Makmun
 Wān Manghsu-ling
 Wān Maü (21°43'0"N 97°18'0"E)
 Wān Mau (21°9'0"N 97°17'0"E)
 Wān Maü (21°9'0"N 97°10'0"E)
 Wan Mau (21°4'0"N 97°12'0"E)
 Wān Maw
 Wān Me-pu
 Wān Me-songlaw
 Wān Ming Ak
 Wān Möng (21°50'0"N 97°46'0"E)
 Wān Möng (21°36'0"N 97°44'0"E)
 Wān Nā
 Wan Na-hi
 Wān Na-hpeit
 Wān Nā-keng (21°57'0"N 97°17'0"E)
 Wān Nā-keng (21°37'0"N 97°16'0"E)
 Wān Nā King
 Wān Nā-kong
 Wān Nā-lèk
 Wan Na-lin
 Wān Namhkai
 Wān Namhkai
 Wan Namhkawng
 Wan Namhkon
 Wān Nam Hkot
 Wān Namhu-mawng
 Wān Namküng
 Wān Nammaw
 Wan Nammawhsim
 Wān Nammawhson
 Wān Nammawlong
 Wān Nammawping
 Wān Nā-mong
 Wan Nā-mun
 Wān Na-ong (21°54'0"N 97°21'0"E)
 Wan Nā Ong (21°16'0"N 97°2'0"E)
 Wān Napin
 Wān Nā-ping
 Wān Nā-sam
 Wān Nā-tat
 Wān Nawnghio
 Wan Nawng Hpat
 Wan Nawng King
 Wan Nawngkot
 Wan Nawngmo
 Wan Nawngpa-yem
 Wan Nawngya-hsai
 Wān Ngai
 Wān Pahka (21°50'0"N 97°21'0"E)
 Wān Pahka (21°45'0"N 97°27'0"E)
 Wān Pa-hkaw
 Wan Pa-mawng
 Wan Pa-men
 Wān Pang
 Wān Pangpaw-ye
 Wān Pangpoi
 Wan Pang-yang
 Wānpa Sak
 Wān Pa Taung
 Wān Pāw
 Wān Pawng
 Wān Pa-yang
 Wān-pēk
 Wān Pek-yai
 Wān Pöng (21°33'0"N 97°35'0"E)
 Wān Pong (21°10'0"N 97°10'0"E)
 Wān Pongyawng
 Wān Pyi-yi
 Wān Sam
 Wan Sangleik
 Wān Se
 Wan Tai
 Wān Ta Mai
 Wān Tam Ngong
 Wān Tamngong
 Wān Tan
 Wan Tawng
 Wān Tawngkaw
 Wan Teung
 Wān Yat
 Wèng-leng
 Wen Long
 Yanghkam
 Yangloi
 Yang Yong
 Ya-nio
 Yein Leng
 Ye-pyu
 Ying-nāng
 Ywa Tawng Kaw

Notes

External links
 "Mongkaung Township - Shan State" Map, 14 June 2010, Myanmar Information Management Unit (MIMU)

Townships of Shan State
Loilen District